Cremastobombycia is a genus of moths in the family Gracillariidae.

Species
Cremastobombycia ambrosiaeella (Chambers, 1871)
Cremastobombycia grindeliella (Walsingham, 1891)
Cremastobombycia ignota (Frey & Boll, 1873)
Cremastobombycia kipepeo de Prins, 2012
Cremastobombycia lantanella Busck, 1910
Cremastobombycia morogorene de Prins, 2012
Cremastobombycia solidaginis (Frey & Boll, 1876)
Cremastobombycia verbesinella (Busck, 1900)

External links
Global Taxonomic Database of Gracillariidae (Lepidoptera)

Lithocolletinae
Gracillarioidea genera
Taxa named by Annette Frances Braun